Tabebuia stenocalyx is a species of Tabebuia native to Trinidad.

References

External links
 
 

stenocalyx
Plants described in 1910
Flora of Trinidad